is the theatrical tokusatsu superhero film adaptation of the Kamen Rider Den-O TV series directed by Takao Nagaishi and written by Yasuko Kobayashi. The movie takes place between episodes 27 and 28 of the series, featuring the DenLiner and its passengers travel as far back as the Edo period of Japan.

The film is produced by Ishimori Productions and Toei, the producers of all the previous television series and films under the Kamen Rider franchise. Following the tradition of all Heisei Kamen Rider movies, it is a double bill with 2007's Super Sentai movie, Juken Sentai Gekiranger: Nei-Nei! Hou-Hou! Hong Kong Decisive Battle, both of which premiered on August 4, 2007. The film's title is translated into English as both Masked Rider Den-O The Movie: I'm Born! and I'll be born! on the initial collector's pack DVD release.

During its first week at the theaters, the movie came in 4th place and was the highest selling Japanese production of the week.

Plot
Ryotaro pursues the Molech Imagin to May 8, 2000 and becomes Kamen Rider Den-O to destroy the Imagin. Though it seemed the danger passed, it turned out that the Molech Imagin was under the employ of a rogue Kamen Rider named Gaoh who hijacks the DenLiner with his band of Imagin. After knocking Ryotaro out when he and Hana attempted to board the DenLiner while trapping all the Taros sae Ryutaros, Gaoh steals Owner's Master Pass with the intent to travel back in time via "God's Line" to Japan's Edo Period to retrieve the legendary God's Train, the GaohLiner. Trapped in 2000, with Ryotaro having lost all memory of Den-O, he and Hana encounter Ryotaro's younger self, later called Kotaro by the group, and the Imagin Sieg that they aided earlier. Momotaros arrives after escaping the DenLiner, but he is only able to possess Kotaro while Sieg's special talents allow him to still possess Ryotaro. Yuto shows up, taking everyone on the ZeroLiner to pursue Gaoh, with Kotaro joining them. Gaoh uses the DenLiner to damage the ZeroLiner before transforming into his Kamen Rider Form to send the gang into the Mesozoic Era before they are able to reach the Edo Period. While Yuto fixes the ZeroLiner, Ryotaro and Kyotaro talk, revealing that the event Ryotaro most regrets is losing the only remaining photograph of his parents, who died when he was young, because he cannot remember their faces without the photograph.

The next day, getting the aid of Senhime, Ryotaro and company sneak into the camp of Yukimura Sanada, who is aiding Gaoh. Though the reunited Tarōs defeat Sanada's ninjas, with Sieg destroying the Cobra Imagin as Den-O Wing Form, Gaoh succeeds in obtaining the GaohLiner and travels forward to December 26, 1988, the day Ryotaro was born, to erase that day and thus eliminate Ryotaro. After regaining his memory and his ability to transform, Ryotaro is forced to fight Gaoh along with Momotaros and his band until Yuto arrives with the past Ryotaros he borrowed for the "Climax Scene".  After the long battle, the Den-Os and Zeronos emerge victorious as Gaoh's followers are wiped out and the GaohLiner is destroyed by the DenLiner and ZeroLiner. Surviving the GaohLiner's destruction, Gaoh dies in a final duel with Den-O Sword Form, reduced to sand. On the return trip to his own time, the DenLiner comes across Ryotaro's old house, allowing Ryotaro and Kotaro to see the faces of their parents. Sieg and Kotaro also return to their respective timelines as well, resuming their places in history. When Ryotaro returns to the present, he finds a drawing of his parents in the picture frame where the original photo once was.

Characters

Characters from the TV series
It was lost when Sieg had to be sent back in time to 1997, but he is retrieved to aid Ryotaro in the Tarōs' absence.

: In the trailer, he reveals the existence of God's Line, a railway in time that allows travelers with a Master Pass to venture on it to go to any time period.

Movie-exclusive characters
: He is a king of bandits from the Warring States era and leads a troop of Imagin with which he plans on using to take over the DenLiner. On his journey, he also obtains Yukimura's help in unearthing the GaohLiner. His main goal is to take over all of time and space.
: A Japanese historical figure, the daughter of shogun Tokugawa Hidetada.
: A Japanese historical figure, a samurai and son of the Sengoku period daimyō Sanada Masayuki. Yukimura an unwilling aid to Gaoh in unearthing the GaohLiner with the aid of his Ninja Corps.
: Yukimura's subordinate, sent after Ryotaro on Yukimura's orders from Gaoh.
: Yukimura's subordinate, he escorts Senhime to Toyotomi Hideyori's place.
: Ryotaro's younger self at age 11 that joins the DenLiner group in fighting Gaoh and his Imagin underlings. The Tarōs can also possess him due to their contracts with Ryotaro which extend into the past. Momotaros does so and allows Kotaro to become Mini Den-O Sword Form. Kotaro's transformation earns him the title of being the youngest Rider in history at age 11.
: The father of Airi and Ryotaro. 33 years old.
: The mother of Airi and Ryotaro. 31 years old.

Imagin
Since Ryotaro succumbed to temporary memory loss, the Tarōs obtained physical form temporarily. They do so to fight off the Ninja Corps and the Sanada Ten Braves.

Imagin from the TV series

: An Imagin who was on DenLiner for a while before he was taken to June 1, 1997. When Ryotaro and Hana were stranded in 2000, they meet up with Sieg who aids Ryotaro in the Tarōs' absence as repayment for preventing his disappearance. He once again provides Ryotaro with the ability to become Wing Form.

Gaoh's subordinates
He fights Den-O Sword Form and is defeated in episode 27, serving as a distraction for Gaoh.
He fights Den-O Wing Form in the Edo period.
He fights Den-O Rod Form on December 26, 1988.
He fights Den-O Gun Form on December 26, 1988.
 who is based on the legend of "The Mystery of the Newt". He fights Den-O Ax Form on December 26, 1988.

Momotaros's Summer Vacation
 is a short film that debuted between the Gekiranger movie and I'm Born!. After being made fun of by Urataros and Ryutaros, and bashed by Kintaros, Momotaros is talked into believing he can swim by Deneb. But as the "mind over matter" influence wears off, the Imagin and Sha-Fu tell the audience the movie's coming up soon.

Cast
: 
: 
: 
: 
: 
:  of Run&Gun
: 
: 
: 
: 
: 
: 
: 
: 
: 
: 
: 
:

Voice actors
: 
: 
: 
: 
: 
: 
: 
: 
: 
:

Songs
Theme song

Lyrics & Composition: Shogo.k
Arrangement: Seiji Kameda
Artist: 175R

Insert song
"Climax Jump HIPHOP ver."
Lyrics: Shoko Fujibayashi
Composition & Arrangement: Shuhei Naruse
Singers: AAA Den-O form
Other songs
"Double-Action GAOH form"
Lyrics: Shoko Fujibayashi
Composition: LOVE+HATE
Arrangement: Shuhei Naruse
Artist: Gaoh (Hiroyuki Watanabe)
This song was not utilized in the theatrical release of the film but was placed on its soundtrack. It was also placed in the Final Cut Version DVD release.
"Double-Action Wing form"
Lyrics: Shoko Fujibayashi
Composition: LOVE+HATE, Shuhei Naruse
Arrangement: Shuhei Naruse
Artist: Ryotaro Nogami & Sieg (Takeru Satoh & Shin-ichiro Miki)
This song was not utilized in the theatrical release but was used in the Final Cut Version.  It also plays during Sieg's appearance in the final episode of the TV series.

DVD releases
The movie was initially released on DVD in Japan on January 28, 2008, in a normal edition and a  that came with a bonus disc. On May 21, 2008, the  version was released which included 12 minutes of unreleased footage, the Momotaros's Summer Vacation short, and a special release CD with "Double-Action Wing form" and "Double-Action Wing form  Ver." on it.

References

External links
 

Den-O: I'm Born!
2007 films
Japanese science fiction action films
Jidaigeki films
Films about time travel
2007 science fiction action films
Films scored by Toshihiko Sahashi